UWH is an abbreviation that may mean

 UnderWater Hockey
 UNESCO World Heritage